Gessie is a small unincorporated community in Highland Township, Vermillion County, in the U.S. state of Indiana.

History
The town was laid out in 1872 by Robert J. Gessie, who gave the town his name. A post office was established at Gessie in 1872, and remained in operation until 1967.

The sole business in the town was a grain elevator, next to the CSX railroad tracks. The grain elevator was destroyed by a tornado. Remnants of the elevator, were used to build a series of grain bins on the east side of town across the tracks.

Geography
Gessie is located at 40°05'00" North, 87°29'57" West (40.083333, -87.499167), less than two miles east of the Indiana-Illinois state line.

References

Unincorporated communities in Vermillion County, Indiana
Unincorporated communities in Indiana
Terre Haute metropolitan area